Frances Josephine Kelly ( – 2002; usually known as Judy Boland), was an Irish painter. She is known for being the wife of Frederick Boland, an Irish diplomat who served as the United Nations representative for Ireland. By the age of twenty seven, when she married, she had attained prominence as a painter.

Early life 
On 11 February 1935, she married Irish diplomat Frederick Boland in the Church of St Michael, Dún Laoghaire, Dublin, Ireland. They had a son, Fergal and four daughters; Jane, Nessa, Mella, and the poet Eavan Boland.

Artistic career
Kelly studied at the Metropolitan School of Art, Dublin, Ireland, and, from 1932–1935, in Paris, France with the cubist painter Léopold Survage. In Ireland, she painted the murals in Tullamore Hospital, Dublin, and those at the old Russell Hotel. Kelly specialized in still life works. Her work was part of the painting event in the art competition at the 1932 Summer Olympics.

Paintings
Still Life with Lillies and Staffordshire Figurine
  As She Moved Through the Fair
Still Life With Flowers Before a Window
Reclining Nude

References

External links
Whytes  Biographies of Irish Artists
Frances J. Kelly on ArtUK

1908 births
2002 deaths
20th-century Irish painters
Irish women painters
20th-century Irish women artists
Alumni of the National College of Art and Design
Olympic competitors in art competitions